Alabama Thunderpussy, originally known as Alabama Thunder Pussy, is an American heavy metal band from Richmond, Virginia. It was founded by Bryan Cox, Erik Larson and Asechiah Bogdan in 1996.

History
Bryan Cox, Erik Larson and Asechiah Bogdan founded ATP in 1996. Bill Storms and Johnny Throckmorton completed the lineup, and the band signed to Man's Ruin Records in 1998. They debuted with Rise Again later that year, and recorded River City Revival, released in 1999. 2000 brought Constellation. 

The band released a split with Halfway to Gone the same year. The split was the first time that the band was billed as Alabama Thunderpussy. 2002's Staring at the Divine followed. Alabama Thunderpussy parted ways with Man's Ruin and singer Johnny Throckmorton later that year, signing to Relapse Records and hiring new frontman Johnny Weills. Weills performed vocals on the album Fulton Hill (album), released on May 25, 2004. By the time of the following ATP album, Open Fire, Weills had left the band to form Danballah in Columbus, Ohio. He was replaced by Kyle Thomas, formerly of New Orleans bands Floodgate and Exhorder.

Members of ATP have appeared in many side projects. Larson has released two discs under his name, the most recent in 2005. Larson has also appeared in the side project Axehandle with Bryan Cox and Ryan Lake. Erik also appears in another side project group Birds of Prey with a release from July 25, 2006. Erik Larson was also the former drummer for AVAIL. Bryan Cox was a member of instrumental band Suzukiton and was on their one release, Service Repair Handbook. Bogdan was a member of Windhand between 2009 and 2015.

Former vocalist Johnny Throckmorton is now the vocalist for Richmond, Virginia-based Before the Machine.

Open Fire, the band's most recent CD, was released March 6, 2007, on Relapse Records.

In 2022, Alabama Thunderpussy announced their first tour since 2007.

Line-up
 Kyle Thomas – vocals
 Erik Larson – guitar
 Ryan Lake – guitar
 Sam Krivanec – bass
 Bryan Cox – drums

Former members
 Johnny Throckmorton – vocals (1996–2002)
 Johnny Weills – vocals
 Asechiah "Cleetus LeRoque" Bogden – guitars
 Mike Bryant – bass 
 John Peters – bass
 E.t. Snider  – bass (died)
 Bill Storms – bass (died 1997)
 Bill Rose – bass

Discography

Albums
 Rise Again (1998)
 River City Revival (1999)
 Constellation (2000)
 Staring at the Divine (2002)
 Fulton Hill (2004)
 Open Fire (2007)

Split albums
 Alabama Thunderpussy/Halfway to Gone (2000)
 Orange Goblin/Alabama Thunderpussy (2000)

Compilations
Right In The Nuts: A Tribute to Aerosmith (July 10, 2000), Small Stone Records
Sucking the 70's (2002), Small Stone Records
Sucking the 70's – Back in the Saddle Again (2006), Small Stone Records
For the Sick (March 20, 2007) Emetic Records
On Your Knees: The Tribute to Judas Priest (2007)

References

External links
 Alabama Thunderpussy at Relapse Records
 Alabama Thunderpussy at Musicmight
 Alabama Thunderpussy at Encyclopaedia Metallum
 Open Fire review from kvltsite.com

Heavy metal musical groups from Virginia
Music of Richmond, Virginia
Musical groups established in 1996
Musical groups disestablished in 2008
Relapse Records artists
American stoner rock musical groups
Musical quintets